Tonko Limba is a chiefdom in Kambia District of Sierra Leone with a population of 39,106. Its principal town is Madina.

References

Chiefdoms of Sierra Leone
Northern Province, Sierra Leone